Duncan Town Airport  is an airport located near Duncan Town, on Ragged Island in The Bahamas.

Facilities

References

External links
 

Airports in the Bahamas